Andriy Yaroslavovych Pokladok (born 21 June 1971) is a Ukrainian retired professional footballer.

External links

References

1971 births
Living people
People from Yavoriv
Ukrainian footballers
Ukrainian Premier League players
FC Skala Stryi (1911) players
FC Karpaty Lviv players
FC Metalurh Donetsk players
FC Spartak Ivano-Frankivsk players
FC Nyva Vinnytsia players
FC Oleksandriya players
FC Rava Rava-Ruska players
Ukrainian football managers
FC Halychyna Lviv
Association football forwards
Sportspeople from Lviv Oblast